Thomas Boyd Caldwell (February 22, 1856 – March 26, 1932) was a Canadian politician.

Born in Lanark, Canada West, the son of Boyd Caldwell and Dinah Waugh, Caldwell was educated at the Lanark Public School and the
Kingston Collegiate Institute. A woolen manufacturer, he was elected to the House of Commons of Canada for the electoral district of Lanark North in the 1904 federal election. A Liberal, he was defeated in 1900 (by only 7 votes), 1908 (by only 6 votes), and 1911. From 1883 to 1893, he was a Captain and Paymaster with the 42nd Lanark and Renfrew Battalion of Infantry.

References
 
 The Canadian Parliament; biographical sketches and photo-engravures of the senators and members of the House of Commons of Canada. Being the tenth Parliament, elected November 3, 1904

1856 births
1932 deaths
Liberal Party of Canada MPs
Members of the House of Commons of Canada from Ontario